The 1949 Pau Grand Prix was a non-championship Formula One motor race held on 18 April 1949 at the Pau circuit, in Pau, Pyrénées-Atlantiques, France. The Grand Prix was won by Juan Manuel Fangio, driving the Maserati 4CLT/48. Toulo de Graffenried finished second and Benedicto Campos third.

Classification

Race

References

Pau Grand Prix
Pau
Pau Grand Prix
Pau Grand Prix